Possession is a 2002 romantic mystery drama film written and directed by Neil LaBute and starring Gwyneth Paltrow and Aaron Eckhart. It is based on the 1990 novel of the same name by British author A. S. Byatt, who won the Booker Prize for it the year it was published.

Synopsis
Literary scholars American Roland Michell and British Maud Bailey independently find that the socially antagonistic relationship between the Victorian era poets Randolph Henry Ash and Christabel LaMotte may have concealed a secret connection as lovers. Ash is traditional and conservative and LaMotte is a freethinking bisexual. Rival scholars become aware of their efforts and each seeks to be the first at the public disclosure of this major finding about the poets. In a parallel relationship, Michell and Bailey have their own deepening connection.

Cast

Development
Three early drafts of the film's screenplay were written by American playwright David Henry Hwang in the 1990s, but the project languished in pre-production for years. Directors such as Sydney Pollack and Gillian Armstrong worked on the film and eventually gave up before LaBute became director. LaBute made drastic changes to the story, based partially on notes that original author Byatt had made on earlier drafts of the screenplay, as she recognized that Roland Michell had to "exist on screen" in a different way than he did in the book.

LaBute recalled:

 
LaBute changed Roland's nationality from British to American, and made him more brash and active. He denied that this was "shameless pandering to the audience. ... in part, it was [just] more comfortable for me to write Roland that way."

Casting
Ralph Fiennes was approached for the role as Randolph Ash that eventually went to Jeremy Northam.

Reception
The review aggregator website Rotten Tomatoes reported an approval rating of 63%, with an average rating of 6.30/10, based on 156 reviews. The site's critics consensus reads: "It's perhaps a bit tame and uninspiring, considering its subject matter, but Possession manages enough romance and period intrigue to satisfy most fans of its source material." On Metacritic, the film has a weighted average score of 52 out of 100, based on 34 critics, indicating "mixed or average reviews".

Roger Ebert awarded the film three stars and a half out of four.

Daniel Zalewski of The New York Times noted that director LaBute, "known for savagely blunt stage and screen dramas ... has here infused a British novelist's main characters with the same stutter-and-slang rhythms, male-bonding repartée and sarcastic volleys that define his own distinctly American work." He said, "In the end, Mr. LaBute's grafting of his own sensibility onto Roland creates a weird tonal clash."

Jamie Russell of the BBC said, "Lacking the intelligence of an arthouse picture, or the classy sheen of a British production, "Possession" isn't possessed of anything other than over-wrought emotionalism and unintentional silliness."
 
Rob Gonsalves said, "Possession is a dual-track exploration of romantic mores then and now ... A film like this rides on the quality of the acting, and the Brits – Northam and Ehle – invest their forbidden love with centuries of fine repressed English tradition."

The film grossed $14,815,898 worldwide.

Releases
The film has been released on DVD with subtitles and captions.

References

External links
 
 
 
 
 
 

2002 films
2002 drama films
American LGBT-related films
2000s English-language films
Films directed by Neil LaBute
Films based on British novels
Lesbian-related films
Female bisexuality in film
Films shot in North Yorkshire
Films set in Yorkshire
Focus Features films
Warner Bros. films
Universal Pictures films
British nonlinear narrative films
American nonlinear narrative films
Films scored by Gabriel Yared
2000s American films
2000s British films